Protecting Canada's Immigration System Act, or Bill C-31, is an act of the 41st Canadian Parliament - sponsored by the Minister of Citizenship, Immigration and Multiculturalism, Jason Kenney. 

Introduced on 16 February 2012 and receiving Royal Assent on 28 June 2012, Kenney claimed that the bill is necessary to protect the refugee system, and that it would address the number of "bogus refugees" and claimants from European Union democracies. As such, the Act purposed to amend Canada's Immigration and Refugee Protection Act, Balanced Refugee Reform Act, Marine Transportation Security Act, and the Department of Citizenship and Immigration Act.

Changes 
The following changes were made by the bill:
the immigration minister would have the power to choose which countries are safe without a committee including human rights experts
rejected refugee claimants from countries on the safe country list would no longer be able to appeal the decision to the Immigration and Refugee Board
claimants from countries on the safe country list would have to wait a year before applying for compassionate and humanitarian considerations to become permanent residents and could be deported in the meanwhile
claimants from countries on the safe country list would be able to ask for a judicial review by the Federal Court, but could be deported before the court makes a decision
biometric identification would be implemented for people that apply for visas to visit Canada

Criticism 
Don Davies criticized the bill, saying that it broke the compromise previously reached within the government and that it "puts too much power in the hands of the minister."

Amnesty International, the Canadian Association of Refugee Lawyers, the Canadian Civil Liberties Association, and the Canadian Council for Refugees called for the withdrawal of the bill, claiming that it has provisions that would give "Ministers broad, unfettered and unprecedented powers," and would:…arbitrarily detain groups of refugees; keep parents, children and spouses apart for years; undermine the fairness of the refugee claim and protection process; introduce the use of biometrics; and authorize the stripping of permanent residence from refugees…Human Rights Watch also criticized the bill, saying that "[s]ubjecting 16- and 17-year-old children to mandatory, unreviewable detention backtracks on Canada’s commitments to children," and that "[w]e believe it is impossible to make a blanket determination that any country is safe for everyone and would never produce a refugee."

See also
Canadian immigration and refugee law

References

Refugees in Canada
Canadian immigration law
Canadian federal legislation
41st Canadian Parliament
2012 in Canadian law
Immigration legislation